Łukasz Kubot and Oliver Marach were the defenders of championship title; however, they were defeated by Polish unseeded pair Tomasz Bednarek and Mateusz Kowalczyk in the first round (6–1, 0–6, [10–12]).
Robert Lindstedt and Horia Tecău won in the final 6–2, 3–6, [10–7], against Rohan Bopanna and Aisam-ul-Haq Qureshi.

Seeds

Draw

Draw

References
 Main Draw

Grand Prix Hassan II - Doubles
- Doubles, 2010 Grand Prix Hassan Ii